Geoffrey Quilley (born  is professor of art history at the University of Sussex. He was previously curator of fine art at the National Maritime Museum, Greenwich, and before that lecturer at the University of Leicester. Quilley studied at the University of Warwick at both undergraduate (BA Hons) and postgraduate (PhD) levels.

Selected publications

Articles
"'By cruel foes oppress'd': British naval draughtsmen in Tahiti and the South Pacific in the 1840s", Journal of Historical Geography, 43. pp. 71–84. ISSN 0305-7488
"Introduction: mapping the art of travel and exploration", Journal of Historical Geography, 43. pp. 2–8. ISSN 0305-7488
"Art history and double consciousness: visual culture and eighteenth-century maritime Britain", Eighteenth-Century Studies, 48 (1). pp. 21–35. ISSN 0013-2586

Books
Empire to Nation: Art, History, and the Visualization of Maritime Britain, 1768-1829. Paul Mellon Centre for Studies in British Art. Yale University Press, New Haven and London, 2011. 
Art for the Nation: The Oil Paintings Collections of the National Maritime Museum. National Maritime Museum, London, 2006.

References

External links 
http://www.tate.org.uk/research/publications/tate-papers/re-enacting-art-and-travel

Living people
Academics of the University of Sussex
Alumni of the University of Warwick
Academics of the University of Leicester
Year of birth missing (living people)